Kilfarboy, or Milltown Malbay is a parish in County Clare and part of the Críocha Callan grouping of parishes within the Roman Catholic Diocese of Killaloe. 

Current (2022) co-parish priest is Donagh O'Meara.

Churches
There are two churches in the parish.

The main church is the Church of St. Joseph in Milltown Malbay. It was built in 1839-1840. It was finished in 1863 when the tower and spire were added. The church replaced an older thatched chapel that was. De site was donated by the landlord Fitzgerald after the landlord Moroney, who owned the townlands of Milltown Malbay, refused a site.

The second church of the parish is the St. Mary's Chapel in Moy. This rectangular chapel was built in 1872. Just as with the church in Milltown Malbay, the site was donated by landlord Fitzgerald.

gallery

References

Parishes of the Roman Catholic Diocese of Killaloe